Mitchily Waul (born 13 September 1985) is a Jamaican international footballer who plays for Charlotte Eagles, as a striker.

Career
Waul has played club football for August Town, Harbour View and Tivoli Gardens in the Jamaica National Premier League.

He made his international debut for Jamaica in 2012.

References

1985 births
Living people
Jamaican footballers
Jamaican expatriate footballers
Jamaica international footballers
Harbour View F.C. players
Tivoli Gardens F.C. players
Charlotte Eagles players
Expatriate soccer players in the United States
USL Championship players
August Town F.C. players
Association football forwards